Paragymnomenia is a genus of cavibelonian solenogasters, shell-less, worm-like, marinemollusks.

Species
 Paragymnomenia richardi Leloup, 1947

References

External links
 Gofas, S.; Le Renard, J.; Bouchet, P. (2001). Mollusca. in: Costello, M.J. et al. (eds), European Register of Marine Species: a check-list of the marine species in Europe and a bibliography of guides to their identification. Patrimoines Naturels. 50: 180-213
 Neave, Sheffield Airey. (1939-1996). Nomenclator Zoologicus vol. 1-10 Online

Solenogastres